The Royal Gambler is a South Korean historical drama starring Jang Keun-suk, Yeo Jin-goo, Jun Kwang-ryul, Choi Min-soo, Yoon Jin-seo, and Lim Ji-yeon. It replaced Six Flying Dragons and aired on SBS on Mondays and Tuesdays at 22:00 (KST) from March 28, 2016, to June 14, 2016, for 24 episodes.

Plot 
This drama is about a prince who's forced to live as a commoner and uses his gambling skills to take revenge on the King.
Dae-Gil (Jang Geun-suk) and King Yeongjo (Yeo Jin-goo) enter a match. Dae-Gil bets his life and King Yeongjo bets the entire Kingdom of Joseon on the outcome.
Dae-Gil is the best gambler in the Joseon era. He holds deep resentment inside, but is also cool on the exterior. King Yeongjo is a man who never lowers his head without a convincing reason. Meanwhile, Dam-Seo (Lim Ji-yeon) exists solely to take revenge upon king.

Cast

Main cast 
 Jang Geun-suk as Baek Dae-gil
 Yeo Jin-goo as Prince Yeoning (King Yeongjo)
 Jun Kwang-ryul as 
 Choi Min-soo as King Sukjong
 Yoon Jin-seo as Consort Suk
 Lim Ji-yeon as Dam-seo
 Hyun Woo as Yoon (King Gyeongjong)

Supporting cast 
 Im Hyun-sik as Nam Dokkebi
 Ahn Gil-kang as Kim Che-gun
 Song Jong-ho as Kim Yi-soo
 Ji Il-joo as Moo-myung
 Han Jung-soo as Hwang Jin-gi
 Han Ki-woong as Sa Woon
 Han Ki-won as Sa Mo
 Oh Yeon-ah as Jang Ok-jung
 Yoon Ji-hye as Hong-Mae
 Lee Moon-sik as Baek Man-geum
 Jeon Soo-jin as Hwanggoo Mom 
 Kim Yoo-chul as Daegari 
 Jun Jae-hyung as Gamoolchi 
 Baek Seung-hyeon as Jang Hee-jae (Jang Ok-jung's brother)
 Heo Tae-hee as Sang-gil (Yeongjo's bodyguard) 
 Lee Ga-hyun as Hwa-jin 
 Cha Soon-bae as Jo Tae-gu 
 Na Jae-woong as Choi Seok-hang
 Kim Ga-eun as Gye Sul-im
 Kim Sung-oh as Hwanghae-do's Gaejakdoo
 Hong Ah-reum as Yeon Hwa

Ratings 
In the table below, the blue numbers represent the lowest ratings and the red numbers represent the highest ratings.

Original soundtrack

OST Part 1

OST Part 2

OST Part 3

OST Part 4

International broadcast 
In the United States, the drama airs in the Los Angeles DMA free, over-the-air on LA 18 KSCI-TV (channel 18) with English subtitles, Mon-Tue 9:15PM, from April 25 to July 12, 2016.

Awards and nominations

References

External links
 

Seoul Broadcasting System television dramas
South Korean historical television series
2016 South Korean television series debuts
2016 South Korean television series endings